The 2022 Colorado Attorney General election took place on November 8, 2022, to elect the attorney general of Colorado. Incumbent Democrat Phil Weiser won re-election to a second term.

Democratic primary

Candidates

Nominee
Phil Weiser, incumbent attorney general

Results

Republican primary

Candidates

Nominee
John Kellner, district attorney for the 18th district court of Colorado

Disqualified
Stanley Thorne (running as independent)

Declined
Jason R. Dunn, former United States Attorney for the district of Colorado
Mark Waller, former member of the Colorado House of Representatives from the 15th district

Results

Independents

Candidates

Declared
Stanley Thorne, attorney (write-in candidate)

General election

Predictions

Endorsements

Polling

Results

Notes

Partisan clients

References

External links 
Official campaign websites
John Kellner (R) for Attorney General
Phil Weiser (D) for Attorney General

Attorney General
Colorado
Colorado Attorney General elections